Gangs of Oz is an Australian television documentary series on the Seven Network narrated by actor Colin Friels. The show looks at real stories of Australia's criminal underworld with accounts from criminals, their families and the police who risk their lives to catch them.

Episodes
Season 1
Episode 1 – Middle Eastern Gangs – The Power, The Passion, The Betrayal
Episode 2 – The Aussie Mafia – Inside The Family
Episode 3 – The Bikies – Inside The Band of Brothers
Episode 4 – The Gangland Wars – The Tale of Three Gangs
Episode 5 – Asian Gangs – Chasing The Dragon

Season 2
Episode 1 – The Bikies – Taking Care of Business
Episode 2 – The Bikies – For Love Or Money
Episode 3 – Young Guns... Loose Canons
Episode 4 – Armed and Dangerous
Episode 5 – White Powder Wars
Episode 6 – In From The Cold
Episode 7 – Friends in High Places

References

2000s Australian documentary television series
2010s Australian documentary television series
Seven Network original programming
2009 Australian television series debuts
2010 Australian television series endings